The Round Barn near Columbus Grove, Ohio, United States, was a round barn that was built in 1910.  It was listed on the National Register of Historic Places in 1980.

The barn has been destroyed.

References

Barns on the National Register of Historic Places in Ohio
Buildings and structures in Putnam County, Ohio
National Register of Historic Places in Putnam County, Ohio
Infrastructure completed in 1910
Round barns in Ohio